Kupferzellia is an extinct genus of Triassic capitosauroid temnospondyl amphibian.

References

Capitosaurs
Fossil taxa described in 1997